The 2006 CIS Men's Basketball Championship was held March 16-19, 2006. The Carleton Ravens won their fourth straight national title.

Bracket

Tournament Awards
MVP: Osvaldo Jeanty, Carleton
All-stars:
Ryan Bell, Carleton
Brandon Ellis, Victoria
Jacob Doerksen, Victoria
Ryan Keliher, Cape Breton
Alexander Stephen, StFX

2006
2005–06 in Canadian basketball